Mac Q. Williamson, born in Nebraska City, Otoe County, Nebraska on October 13, 1889, was the son of Thomas J. (1845-1909) and Susan E. (nee McQuiddy) Williamson (1849-1919)

Mac Q. Williamson moved with his family to Oklahoma City in 1905. They settled in Pauls Valley in 1906. He was admitted to the first class of the University of Oklahoma College of Law, then known as the Oklahoma University Law School, where he graduated in 1910. He became a member of the Oklahoma Bar in 1913. In 1914, he ran for Pauls Valley city attorney and won the position. In 1920, he ran for and won the Garvin County attorney position. He was reelected to the same job two years later. He was elected to the Oklahoma Senate in 1925, where he served until 1932. During 1928, he also served as President Pro Tempore for a year. In 1932, he ran for his first statewide office and won as Attorney General for the State of Oklahoma. Reelected seven times, he remained in this office until he retired in 1963. His 25 years in office are the longest of any Oklahoma Attorney General.

Williamson died at age 75 on October 15, 1964 at his home in Oklahoma City.  He was buried in Mount Olivet Cemetery in Pauls Valley.

See also
Williamson v. Lee Optical Co.

Notes

References 

1889 births
1964 deaths
People from Otoe County, Nebraska
People from Pauls Valley, Oklahoma
Politicians from Oklahoma City
University of Oklahoma College of Law alumni
Oklahoma Attorneys General